Miaoli County legislative districts consist of 2 single-member constituencies, each represented by a member of the Republic of China Legislative Yuan.

Current districts
Miaoli County Constituency 1 - Houlong, Sanyi, Tongluo, Tongxiao, Yuanli, Zaoqiao, Zhunan Townships
Miaoli County Constituency 2 - Miaoli City, Toufen City, Dahu, Gongguan, Nanzhuang, Sanwan, Shitan, Touwu, Tai'an, Zhuolan Townships

Legislators

 Li Yi-ting was removed from office due to election fraud.

 Hsu Yao-chang resigned in 2014 after his election as Miaoli County magistrate.

Election results

References

Constituencies in Taiwan
Miaoli County